Ellobiidae, common name the hollow-shelled snails, is a family of small air-breathing land snails, terrestrial pulmonate gastropod mollusks in the clade Eupulmonata. Ellobiidae is the only family in the superfamily Ellobioidea, according to the taxonomy of the Gastropoda by Bouchet & Rocroi, 2005).

Anatomy
In this family, the number of haploid chromosomes lies between 16 and 20 (according to the values in this table).

They have a distinctive mode of locomotion arising due to a split sole. The front part of the sole adheres to the substrate and then the rear part of the sole is drawn up to the front part.

Taxonomy
Species are traditionally classified into five taxonomic groups, the Pythiidae, the Laemodontidae, the Melampodidae, the Ellobiidae and the Carychiidae. These taxa have been recognized either as families within Ellobioidea or as sub-families within the family Ellobiidae.

The family Ellobiidae consists of the following subfamilies (according to the taxonomy of the Gastropoda by Bouchet & Rocroi, 2005):
 subfamily Ellobiinae Pfeiffer, 1854 (1822)
 subfamily Carychiinae Jeffreys, 1830
 subfamily Melampinae Stimpson, 1851 (1850)
 subfamily Pedipedinae P. Fischer & Crosse, 1880
 subfamily Pythiinae Odhner, 1925 (1880)
 † subfamily Zaptychiinae Wenz, 1938

The high degree of homoplasy in morphological characters and frequent low variability has led to the description of approximately 800 species names available in the literature, of which 250 are likely to be valid.

A molecular study by Dayrat at al. (2011) for the Ellobioidea suggests a monophyletic origin of the entire group.

Genera
Genera within the family Ellobiidae include:

subfamily Ellobiinae
 Blauneria Shuttleworth, 1854
 Ellobium Röding, 1798

subfamily Carychiinae
 Carychium O. F. Müller, 1773
 Zospeum Bourguignat, 1856

subfamily Melampinae
 Melampus Montfort, 1810

subfamily Pedipedinae
 Creedonia Martins, 1996
 Leuconopsis Hutton, 1884
 Marinula King & Broderip, 1832
 Microtralia Dall, 1894
 Pedipes Férussac, 1821
 Pseudomelampus Pallary, 1900
 Sarnia H. Adams & A. Adams, 1855 (temporary name)
subfamily Pythiinae Odhner, 1925
 Allochroa Ancey, 1887
 Auriculastra Martens, 1880
 Cassidula Gray, 1847
Laemodonta Philippi, 1846
Myosotella Monterosato, 1906
 Ophicardelus Beck, 1838
 Ovatella Bivona, 1832
 Pleuroloba Hyman, Rouse & Ponder, 2005
 Pythia Röding, 1798 - type genus of the subfamily Pythiinae.

† subfamily Zaptychiinae
 † Zaptychius Walcott, 1883 - type genus of the subfamily

subfamily ?
 Auriculinella Tausch, 1886
 Auriculodes Strand, 1928
 Blauneria Shuttleworth, 1854
 Detracia Gray in Turton, 1840
 Tralia Gray, 1840
Genera brought into synonymy
 Alexia Leach in Gray, 1847: synonym of Myosotella Monterosato, 1906
 Auricula Lamarck, 1799: synonym of Ellobium Röding, 1798
 Cremnobates Swainson, 1855: synonym of Marinula King & Broderip, 1832
 Jaminia T. Brown, 1827: synonym of Myosotella Monterosato, 1906
 Kochia Pallary, 1900: synonym of Myosotella Monterosato, 1906
 Laimodonta H. Adams & A. Adams, 1855: synonym of Laemodonta Philippi, 1846
 Leuconia Gray, 1840: synonym of Auriculinella Tausch, 1886
 Leucopepla Peile, 1926: synonym of Auriculinella Tausch, 1886
Leucophytia Winckworth, 1949: synonym of Auriculinella Tausch, 1886
 Monica H. Adams & A. Adams, 1855: synonym of Ovatella Bivona-Bernardi, 1832
 Nealexia Wenz, 1920: synonym of Myosotella Monterosato, 1906
 Phytia: synonym of Pythia Röding, 1798
 Pira H. & A. Adams, 1855: synonym of Melampus Montfort, 1810
 Plecotrema H. Adams & A. Adams, 1854: synonym of Laemodonta Philippi, 1846
 Rangitotoa Powell, 1933: synonym of Microtralia Dall, 1894
Taxonomic note
Genus Sarnia H. Adams & A. Adams, 1855 (temporary name, Sarnia [H. & A. Adams, 1855 (September), The Genera of Recent Mollusca, 2: 239] is an incorrect subsequent spelling of Siona H. Adams & A. Adams, 1855 which is a junior homonym of Siona Duponchel, 1829 [Lepidoptera].)

Ecology
The taxon Ellobioidea comprises a group of morphologically and ecologically highly diverse snails, known to have successfully invaded the marine, brackish water and terrestrial habitats.

These are mostly snails that live in salt marshes and similar maritime habitats, and thus have a tolerance for saline conditions.

References
This article incorporates CC-BY-2.0 text from the reference

External links

 
Gastropod families